E.J. Davis may refer to:

Edmund J. Davis, an American lawyer, soldier, and politician.
Elihu James Davis, an Ontario businessman and political figure.
Elgin Davis, a former professional American football running back.